Serbia–South Korea relations are foreign relations between Serbia and South Korea. Both nations established diplomatic relations in 1989. Serbia has an embassy in Seoul and South Korea has an embassy in Belgrade.

Establishment of diplomatic relations
South Korea established former diplomatic relations with The Socialist Federal Republic of Yugoslavia (SFR Yugoslavia or SFRY) on December 27, 1989. Both countries opened resident embassies in February 1990. Korean foreign minister Choe Ho-jung visited Yugoslavia in March 1990. Yugoslav president Borisav Jović visited South Korea and arranged an air transport agreement in the same year in November.

Diplomatic cessation
While the Yugoslav wars raged, the South Korean embassy withdrew from Serbia in January 1993. Then they maintained deputy diplomatic ties until June 1998. South Korea fully withdrew from Serbia in June 1998 and the Korean embassy in Romania held additional post of an embassy to Serbia. Serbia also withdrew from South Korea in March 1999 and the Serbian embassy in Japan held additional post of an embassy to South Korea.

Restart and stability of diplomatic relations
South Korea reopened embassy in Serbia on March 4, 2002. Serbia reopened embassy in South Korea in March 2004. The same year, KOTRA (Korea Trade Promotion Corporation) opened trade building in Belgrade. The Serbian Ministry of Trade & Industry and Korea International Trade Association (KITA) concluded a cooperation agreement in October 2005. South Korea and Serbia made an agreement on amity on May 16, 2006.

See also

Foreign relations of Serbia
Foreign relations of South Korea
North Korea–Serbia relations

References

External links 
 mofa.go.kr
 hufs.ac.kr

 
Korea, South
Bilateral relations of South Korea